{{Automatic taxobox
| image = caryophyllia2610.jpg
| image_caption = Caryophyllia sp.
| taxon = Caryophyllia
| authority = Lamarck, 1801
| subdivision_ranks = Subgenera and species
| subdivision = 
| synonyms = * Anthophyllum Schweigger, 1819 
 Ceratocyathus Seguenza, 1863
 Cyathina Ehrenberg, 1834
}}Caryophyllia is a genus of solitary corals in the family Caryophylliidae.

Subgenera
The genus has two subgenera and the following species according to the World Register of Marine Species:-

 Subgenus Acanthocyathus Milne Edwards & Haime, 1848
 Caryophyllia decamera Cairns, 1998
 Caryophyllia dentata (Moseley, 1881)
 Caryophyllia grayi (Milne Edwards & Haime, 1848)
 Caryophyllia karubarica Cairns & Zibrowius, 1997
 Caryophyllia quangdongensis Zou, 1984
 Caryophyllia spinicarens (Moseley, 1881)
 Caryophyllia spinigera (Saville-Kent, 1871)
 Caryophyllia unicristata Cairns & Zibrowius, 1997
 Caryophyllia zanzibarensis Zou, 1984
 Subgenus Caryophyllia Lamarck, 1801
 Caryophyllia abrupta Cairns, 1999
 Caryophyllia abyssorum Duncan, 1873
 Caryophyllia alaskensis Vaughan, 1941
 Caryophylliax alberti Zibrowius, 1980
 Caryophyllia ambrosia Alcock, 1898
 Caryophyllia antarctica Marenzeller, 1904
 Caryophyllia antillarum Pourtalès, 1874
 Caryophyllia arnoldi Vaughan, 1900
 Caryophyllia aspera Kitahara, Cairns & Miller, 2010
 Caryophyllia atlantica (Duncan, 1873)
 Caryophyllia balanacea Zibrowius & Gili, 1990
 Caryophyllia barbadensis Cairns, 1979
 Caryophyllia berteriana Duchassaing, 1850
 Caryophyllia calveri Duncan, 1873
 Caryophyllia cintinculata (Alcock, 1898)
 Caryophyllia concreta Kitahara, Cairns & Miller, 2010
 Caryophyllia conferta Dana, 1846
 Caryophyllia cornulum Cairns & Zibrowius, 1997
 Caryophyllia corona Duchassaing, 1870
 Caryophyllia coronula Cairns & Polonio, 2013
 Caryophyllia corrugata Cairns, 1979
 Caryophyllia crosnieri Cairns & Zibrowius, 1997
 Caryophyllia crypta Cairns, 2000
 Caryophyllia cyathus (Ellis & Solander, 1786)
 Caryophyllia diomedeae Marenzeller, 1904
 Caryophyllia eltaninae Cairns, 1982
 Caryophyllia ephyala Alcock, 1891
 Caryophyllia foresti Zibrowius, 1980
 Caryophyllia grandis Gardiner & Waugh, 1938

 Caryophyllia hawaiiensis Vaughan, 1907
 Caryophyllia horologium Cairns, 1977
 Caryophyllia huinayensis Cairns, Haeussermann & Foersterra, 2005
 Caryophyllia inornata (Duncan, 1878)
 Caryophyllia japonica Marenzeller, 1888
 Caryophyllia jogashimaensis Eguchi, 1968
 Caryophyllia kellerae Cairns & Polonio, 2013
 Caryophyllia laevigata Kitahara, Cairns & Miller, 2010
 Caryophyllia lamellifera Moseley, 1881
 Caryophyllia mabahithi Gardiner & Waugh, 1938
 Caryophyllia marmorea Cairns, 1984
 Caryophyllia oblonga Kitahara, Cairns & Miller, 2010
 Caryophyllia octonaria Cairns & Zibrowius, 1997
 Caryophyllia octopali Vaughan, 1907
 Caryophyllia paradoxus Alcock, 1898
 Caryophyllia paucipalata Moseley, 1881
 Caryophyllia perculta Cairns, 1991
 Caryophyllia planilamellata Dennant, 1906
 Caryophyllia polygona Pourtalès, 1878
 Caryophyllia profunda Moseley, 1881
 Caryophyllia protei Duchassaing, 1870
 Caryophyllia quadragenaria Alcock, 1902
 Caryophyllia ralphae Cairns, 1995
 Caryophyllia rugosa Moseley, 1881
 Caryophyllia sarsiae Zibrowius, 1974
 Caryophyllia scobinosa Alcock, 1902
 Caryophyllia secta Cairns & Zibrowius, 1997
 Caryophyllia seguenzae Duncan, 1873
 Caryophyllia sewelli Gardiner & Waugh, 1938
 Caryophyllia smithii Stokes & Broderip, 1828
 Caryophyllia solida Cairns, 1991
 Caryophyllia squiresi Cairns, 1982
 Caryophyllia stellula Cairns, 1998
 Caryophyllia tangaroae Kitahara, Cairns & Miller, 2010
 Caryophyllia transversalis Moseley, 1881
 Caryophyllia valdiviae Zibrowius & Gili, 1990
 Caryophyllia versicolorata Kitahara, Cairns & Miller, 2010
 Caryophyllia zopyros Cairns, 1979

Unallocated species in the genus include:
 Caryophyllia arcuata † Milne Edwards & Haime, 1849 
 Caryophyllia paucipaliata † Yabe & Eguchi, 1932 
 †Caryophyllia viola'' Duncan, 1864

References

Caryophylliidae
Scleractinia genera
Taxa named by Jean-Baptiste Lamarck